Do Not Ignore the Potential is a split LP release by Los Angeles-based experimental punk band The Mae Shi and Indiana-based indie rock band Rapider Than Horsepower.



Track listing

The Mae Shi
 The Potential
 Don't Ignore the Potential
 Remarkably Dirty Animals
 Heartbeeps
 Massively Overwrought
 Nickel Arcade
 The Bear

Rapider Than Horsepower
 Split LP with Mae Shi
 The Real Party
 Look At Me
 Testify
 OOOOOOOHHHHHHH
 Something Dirty
 HA-CHEW
 $15.99
 Radio Activity
 Slow Motion and Descent
 N/A
 C'mon Give Me The Feeling

2006 albums
The Mae Shi albums
Rapider Than Horsepower albums
5 Rue Christine albums
Kill Rock Stars albums